Don't Stop Me Now (lit. But what does the brain tell us) is a 2019 Italian spy comedy film directed by Riccardo Milani.

Cast

References

External links

2019 films
2010s Italian-language films
2010s spy comedy films
2019 comedy films
Italian comedy films
Films directed by Riccardo Milani
Italian spy comedy films
2010s Italian films